Nguyễn Thị Ngọc Khánh (born July 28, 1976, in Hanoi) was crowned the sixth Miss Vietnam on November 1, 1998, at sporting event hall Phan Đình Phùng, Ho Chi Minh City, when she was a student at Law University, Ho Chi Minh City. Her father was  director Đỗ Ngọc. Her mother is a Houtbois-player Lê Thị Thắng. She married Lê Công Định, a prominent lawyer, in 2004. She was a flight attendant, a director of Tien Sa Company, an employee of  Sacchi Sacchi advertising company and model.

Miss Viet Nam 1998 
 Winner : Nguyễn Thị Ngọc Khánh (Saigon)
 First runner-up : Vũ Thị Thu (Quảng Ninh)
 Second runner-up : Ngô Thuý Hà (Hà Nội)

Miss International Fashion Egypt 1999 
Ngoc Khanh is first runner-up in Miss International Fashion Egypt 1999,

External links
 Miss Vietnam official website
 Vietnam Television

1976 births
Living people
Miss Vietnam winners
People from Ho Chi Minh City